The UConn Huskies football college football team competes as part of the National Collegiate Athletic Association (NCAA) Division I Football Bowl Subdivision, representing the University of Connecticut in the American Athletic Conference. The Huskies have played their home games at Rentschler Field in East Hartford, Connecticut since 2003.  From 1953 through 2002, the team played home games at Memorial Stadium on campus in Storrs, Connecticut.  The Huskies have recorded 26 conference championships, and have played in 6 Bowl Games, winning 3.  Connecticut made one appearance in the Division I-AA (now FCS) playoffs, in 1998.

Seasons

Notes

References

Connecticut Huskies

UConn Huskies football seasons